The Spirit of St. Louis was a Japan-only EP by British Sea Power combining the title track, its fellow B-side from "The Lonely" UK single, "No Red Indian", the limited issue A Lovely Day Tomorrow, a B-side from the UK "Childhood Memories" single and a Galaxie 500 cover from a covers compilation. It also featured the video for "Remember Me".

Track listing
"The Spirit of St. Louis" – 03:55
"Strange Communication" – 04:09
"A Lovely Day Tomorrow" – 05:00
"Zítra Bude Krásný Den" – 05:01
"Fakir" – 03:09
"No Red Indian" – 03:56
"Tugboat" (Galaxie 500 cover) – 06:49

External links
 The Spirit of St. Louis at Salty Water (fansite)
 "The Spirit of St. Louis" at Salty Water (fansite)

2004 EPs